NJ Transit Rail Operations  is the rail division of NJ Transit. It operates commuter rail service in New Jersey, with most service centered on transportation to and from New York City, Hoboken, and Newark. NJ Transit also operates rail service in Orange and Rockland counties in New York under contract to Metro-North Railroad.

Network and infrastructure 

The lines operated by NJ Transit were formerly operated by the Pennsylvania Railroad, Central Railroad of New Jersey, New York and Long Branch Railroad, and Erie Lackawanna Railroad, most of which date from the mid-19th century. From the 1960s onward, the New Jersey Department of Transportation began subsidizing the commuter lines. By 1976, the lines were all operated by Conrail under contract to NJDOT. The system took its current form in 1983, when NJ Transit took over all commuter service in New Jersey. The two networks were not integrated until the opening of Secaucus Junction in 2003, which enabled passengers to transfer between lines bound for New York and Hoboken.

{
  "type": "ExternalData",
  "service": "geoline",
  "query": "SELECT (?New_Jersey_Transit_Rail_Operations as ?id) ?New_Jersey_Transit_Rail_OperationsLabel (?New_Jersey_Transit_Rail_OperationsLabel as ?title) (concat('#',?sRGB_color_hex_triplet) as ?strokeColor) WHERE { ?New_Jersey_Transit_Rail_Operations wdt:P361 wd:Q7009519. ?New_Jersey_Transit_Rail_Operations wdt:P465 ?sRGB_color_hex_triplet. SERVICE wikibase:label { bd:serviceParam wikibase:language 'en' . } } LIMIT 100"
}

Lines 
, NJ Transit's commuter rail network consists of 11 lines and 164 stations, primarily concentrated in northern New Jersey, with one line running between Atlantic City and Philadelphia.

Current lines 
Operations are in two divisions:
Hoboken Division, formerly operated by the Erie Lackawanna Railroad, runs from Hoboken Terminal or through Newark – Broad Street and includes Midtown Direct service via the Kearny Connection. Most station platforms are low-level.
Newark Division, formerly operated by the Pennsylvania Railroad, Central Railroad of New Jersey and New York and Long Branch Railroad, operates through Newark Penn Station via the Northeast Corridor, with most trains continuing to New York Penn Station. This division also includes the Atlantic City Line formerly operated by the Pennsylvania-Reading Seashore Lines. Most station platforms are high-level.

Freight usage 

Although NJ Transit itself does not carry freight, NJTR allows freight service to be operated over its lines via trackage rights agreements with several railroads. Conrail (CSAO), CSX, Norfolk Southern (NS) and several short lines (Cape May Seashore Lines (CMSL), Dover and Delaware River Railroad (DD), Morristown & Erie Railway (M&E), and Southern Railroad of New Jersey (SRNJ) currently have trackage rights contracts to operate freight service on NJ Transit lines. The Morristown & Erie Railway can only use NJT trackage to get between its owned trackage; it cannot serve customers on NJ Transit trackage. A similar situation exists for Conrail on the Atlantic City Line.

Below is a list of NJ Transit lines and freight lines that operate on them:

Morristown Line: DD, M&E
Montclair-Boonton Line: DD, M&E
Main Line: NS, M&E
Bergen County Line: NS, M&E
Pascack Valley Line: NS
Raritan Valley Line: CSAO
North Jersey Coast Line: CSAO
Atlantic City Line: CSAO, SRNJ

Non-passenger lines 
NJTR also owns several lines not used for regular passenger service. These lines were purchased by the New Jersey Department of Transportation in the late 1970s for railbanking purposes, with ownership transferring to NJ Transit upon its creation in 1979. These lines are either leased for freight/tourist service, interim rail trail use, or remain derelict:
Harrison-Kingsland Branch: derelict
Raritan Valley Line:
High Bridge-Bloomsbury: NS
Bloomsbury-Phillipsburg: trackage removed due to construction of Interstate 78 in 1989
Red Bank-South Lakewood: Conrail Shared Assets Operations (CSAO), Delaware and Raritan River Railroad
Woodmansie-Winslow Junction: derelict
Beesley's Point Secondary:
Winslow Junction-Palermo/Beesley's Point: CSAO, Cape May Seashore Lines
Palermo-Ocean City: leased to city of Ocean City in 1999 for use as interim Ocean City Bike Path rail trail
Tuckahoe-Cape May: Cape May Seashore Lines, Southern Railroad of New Jersey
HX Interlocking (Hackensack River)-Croxton Yard: realigned for Secaucus Junction, used as yard lead by NS
Freehold-Farmingdale: derelict
Freehold-Matawan: leased to Monmouth County Park System until 2020 as interim section of Henry Hudson Trail

Ownership 
NJT owns most of its tracks, infrastructure, bridges, tunnels and signals. The exceptions are:
Atlantic City Line – Philadelphia 30th Street Station to Frankford Junction (owned by Amtrak) and Frankford Junction to Pennsauken Delair Junction (owned by Conrail)
Northeast Corridor Line – entire line except Morrisville Yard (owned by Amtrak)
Port Jervis Line – Suffern to Port Jervis (owned by Norfolk Southern and leased by Metro-North)
Raritan Valley Line – Aldene to Hunter (owned by Conrail)
Montclair-Boonton Line – West of Netcong (owned by Norfolk Southern)

Yards and maintenance 
NJ Transit's main storage and maintenance facility is the Meadows Maintenance Complex in Kearny, New Jersey. Other major yard facilities are located at Hoboken Terminal. Amtrak's Sunnyside Yard in Queens, New York serves as a layover facility for trains to New York Penn Station. Additional yards are located at outlying points along the lines. These include:

Main and Bergen County Lines:
Waldwick Yard
Suffern Yard
Montclair-Boonton Line:
Great Notch Yard, Little Falls
Morris and Essex Lines:
Gladstone Yard
Summit Yard
Dover Yard
Port Morris Yard
North Jersey Coast Line:
Long Branch Yard
Bay Head Yard
Northeast Corridor:
Morrisville Yard, Morrisville, PA (near the Trenton Transit Center)
County Yard, New Brunswick (near Jersey Avenue)
Hudson Yard, Harrison (Serves mostly Raritan Valley Line trains)
Pascack Valley Line:
Woodbine Yard, Spring Valley, NY
Port Jervis Line:
Port Jervis Yard, Port Jervis, NY
Raritan Valley Line:
Raritan Yard
Hudson Yard, Harrison (Shared with Northeast Corridor)

NJT has a fleet of maintenance crews and vehicles that repair tracks, spread ballast, deliver supplies and inspect infrastructure. There are eight non-revenue work diesels used for these purposes.

Movable bridges 

NJT utilizes numerous moveable bridges:

Dock Bridge, Newark (Passaic River) – Northeast Corridor Line (vertical lift) (owned and operated by Amtrak)
Portal Bridge, Secaucus (Hackensack River) – Northeast Corridor Line (swing) (owned and operated by Amtrak)
Newark Draw, Newark (Passaic River) – Morristown Line (swing)
Lower Hack Lift, Jersey City (Hackensack River) – Morristown Line (vertical lift)
Upper Hack Lift, Secaucus (Hackensack River) – Main Line (vertical lift)
HX Draw, Secaucus (Hackensack River) – Bergen County Line and Pascack Valley Line (bascule)
Lyndhurst Draw, Lyndhurst (Passaic River) – Main Line (swing)
River Draw, South Amboy (Raritan River) – North Jersey Coast Line (swing)
Morgan Draw, Old Bridge (Cheesequake Creek) – North Jersey Coast Line (bascule)
Oceanport Draw, Oceanport (Oceanport Creek) – North Jersey Coast Line (swing)
Shark River Draw, Belmar (Shark River) – North Jersey Coast Line (bascule)
Brielle Draw, Brielle (Manasquan River) – North Jersey Coast Line (bascule)
Beach Bridge, Atlantic City (Beach Thorofare) – Atlantic City Line (swing)
Delair Bridge, Pennsauken (Delaware River) – Atlantic City Line (vertical lift) (owned and operated by Conrail)

Rolling stock

Locomotives

Active revenue 
These locomotives carry NJTR reporting marks for revenue service. Not included are the EMU cars, which are technically locomotives, but are listed in the passenger cars roster below.

Retired revenue

Non-revenue 
All non-revenue locomotives are diesel-powered and legally carry the same "NJTR" AAR reporting marks as all other equipment without exception. As these locomotives lack HEP, they do not haul trains in passenger service unless performing a rescue.

Passenger cars 
NJ Transit has a fleet of over 1,000 passenger cars. The fleet and examples are described below.

Except for the Comet II (which are all trailers), all examples shown are cab cars leading or on the tail end of trains.

Car groupings are, except for the Arrow III MUs, arranged in the following order: cab cars, trailers with lavatories, and trailers without lavatories, where applicable.

Single Arrow III MU's are GE Model MA-1J, married pairs are GE Model MA-1H. NJ Transit also leased 10 MARC coaches in 2018 to alleviate an equipment shortage.

Stations 

NJ Transit provides passenger service on 12 lines at total of 165 stations, some of which are operated in conjunction with Amtrak and Metro-North (MNCW).

References

External links 

Official website

 
1983 establishments in New Jersey
Commuter rail in the United States
Electric railways in New Jersey
Electric railways in New York (state)
Electric railways in Pennsylvania
Railway services introduced in 1983
Standard gauge railways in the United States